Ted McBride (1949–2018)  was an American attorney and 37th United States Attorney for the District of South Dakota.

Early life and education
Ted McBride graduated with a J.D.  University of South Dakota School of Law in 1978.

Career
McBride initially served as the interim U.S. Attorney in 1993, after the United States Senate voted to not confirm the appointment of Kevin Schieffer after the controversial handling of the Sue-Dinosaur legal dispute. McBride was then appointed by President Bill Clinton to be the United States Attorney for the District of South Dakota in 1999 to replace outgoing U.S. Attorney Karen Schreier, who was appointed a U.S. District Judge by Clinton. McBride was sworn in as U.S. Attorney later that year. He resigned shortly after the accession of George W. Bush to the U.S. Presidency.

See also
United States Attorney for the District of South Dakota
University of South Dakota School of Law

References

United States Attorneys for the District of South Dakota
University of South Dakota School of Law alumni
1949 births
2018 deaths